The 2009 Grand Prix de Denain was the 51st edition of the Grand Prix de Denain cycle race and was held on 16 April 2009. The race started in Raismes and finished in Denain. The race was won by Jimmy Casper.

General classification

References

2009
2009 in road cycling
2009 in French sport